Dario Simion (born May 22, 1994) is a Swiss professional ice hockey forward who is currently playing for EV Zug of the National League (NL).

Playing career
Simion joined Davos from HC Lugano on a two-year contract from the 2014–15 season on December 16, 2013. In his first season with Davos, Simion enjoyed a breakout year, registering career high's across the board with 13 goals and 27 points in 47 games to be selected as the NLA media's most improved player for 2015.

On June 6, 2018, Simion unexpectedly dissolved his contract with HC Davos to sign a two-year contract worth CHF 1.2 million with EV Zug.

International play
Simion participated at the 2012 World Junior Ice Hockey Championships as a member of the Switzerland men's national junior ice hockey team.

Career statistics

Regular season and playoffs

International

References

External links

1994 births
Living people
HC Lugano players
HC Davos players
Swiss ice hockey forwards
EV Zug players
People from Locarno
Ice hockey players at the 2022 Winter Olympics
Olympic ice hockey players of Switzerland
Sportspeople from Ticino